Hiroshima Art Museum may refer to:

Hiroshima City Museum of Contemporary Art
Hiroshima Museum of Art
Hiroshima Prefectural Art Museum